Serhiy Leonidovych Kulyk (born on 30 March 1964 in Kostiantynivka, Donetsk Oblast, Ukrainian SSR, Soviet Union) is a Ukrainian Lieutenant general. Kulyk was the Director of the Ukrainian State Security Administration (UDO) until 2014.

References 

People from Kostiantynivka
1964 births
Living people
Pro-Ukrainian people of the 2014 pro-Russian unrest in Ukraine
Colonel Generals of Ukraine